A number of countries have had a period of history during which they were a Commonwealth:

Commonwealth of England (1649-1660)
Commonwealth of the Philippines (1935-1946)
Icelandic Commonwealth (930-1262)